Eppler is a surname. Notable people with the surname include:

Billy Eppler (born 1975), American baseball executive
Dieter Eppler (1927–2008), German television actor and director of radio dramas
Erhard Eppler (1926–2019), German politician
Martin J. Eppler (born 1971), Swiss communication and management scholar
Tyler Eppler (born 1993), American professional baseball pitcher